Acacia serpentinicola is a species of wattle native to northern New South Wales.

Description
It has glabrous, terete dark greyish brown branchlets. Like most species of Acacia it has phyllodes rather than true leaves. The glabrous, pungent and subrigid phyllodes are flat and curved to straight with a linear to narrowly oblanceolate shape. It mostly blooms between August and October.

Taxonomy
It belongs to the Acacia juncifolia group and was once regarded as a subspecies of the much more widespread A. juncifolia.

Distribution
It has a limited distribution in north eastern New South Wales where it found on serpentinite ridges between Mount George and Bralga Tops and upper areas of the Barnard River where it is situated in rugged parts of the Great Dividing Range.

See also
 List of Acacia species

References

serpentinicola
Flora of New South Wales
Plants described in 2006
Taxa named by Leslie Pedley